Agenda may refer to:

Information management
 Agenda (meeting), points to be discussed and acted upon, displayed as a list
 Political agenda, the set of goals of an ideological group
 Lotus Agenda, a DOS-based personal information manager
 Personal organizer or agenda, a small notebook for organizing personal information

Music
 Agenda (EP), by Pet Shop Boys, 2019
 The Agenda (album), by Cold Blank, 2012

Organizations
 Agenda (charity), a UK-based charity that campaigns for women and girls at risk
 Agenda (think tank), a Norwegian think tank focused on politics and international affairs

Periodicals and books
 Agenda (feminist journal), an African academic journal of feminism
 Agenda (poetry journal), a UK literary periodical
 Agenda (liturgy), a book used in Lutheran worship
 The Agenda, a 1994 book by Bob Woodward

Places 
 Agenda, Kansas, a city in the United States
 Agenda, Wisconsin, a town in the United States

Television
 Agenda (Australian TV program), a series of programs since 2010
 Agenda (British TV programme), a 1980s current affairs programme
 Agenda (Irish TV programme), a 1999–2004 current events programme
 Agenda (New Zealand TV programme), a 1999–2009 current events programme
 Agenda (Swedish TV program), a 2001 current events programme
 The Agenda, an Ontario, Canada, current affairs program since 2006
 The Agenda with Tom Bradby, a 2012–2016 British chat show